Distillation is the second album by musician Erin McKeown. It was released via Signature Sounds in 2000.

Track listing
 "Queen Of Quiet"
 "Blackbirds"
 "Didn't They?"
 "La Petite Mort"
 "The Little Cowboy"
 "Daisy And Prudence"
 "Fast As I Can"
 "You Mustn't Kick It Around"
 "How To Open My Heart In 4 Easy Steps"
 "Dirt Gardener"
 "Love In 2 Parts"

References

Erin McKeown albums
2000 albums